The Princess is a 2022 American period action comedy thriller film directed by Le-Van Kiet and starring Joey King in the title role with Dominic Cooper, Olga Kurylenko, and Veronica Ngo. The film focuses on a strong-willed princess who fights to protect her family and save the kingdom when her suitor, a cruel sociopath she refuses to marry, intends on taking over the kingdom.

The Princess, released on Hulu on July 1, 2022, received mixed-to-positive reviews from critics, who praised King’s performance, but criticized the screenplay.

Plot
The film is set in a medieval realm ruled by a King and his Queen, who have two daughters, the titular Princess and her younger sister Violet. With the Queen's quiet approval, the Princess was trained in the fighting arts by Linh, the niece of Khai, one of the King's advisors. Since the Queen did not bear any sons, the King had intended to wed the Princess to Julius, the ruthless son of a royal diplomat, who despises the King's peaceful reign because of his belief that a "strong" king should rule with an iron fist. The Princess left him at the altar, and as a result, Julius, his whip-wielding henchwoman Moira, and a band of brutal mercenaries have taken the castle by force, seizing the royal family and their retainers.

The Princess is locked in the top of her castle's highest tower to await her forced wedding with Julius. When two mercenaries enter and prepare to rape her, she kills them and sets out to rescue her family. After she slays several mercenaries on her way, Julius and Moira are finally alerted and send their men after her. She evades her pursuers and meets up with Linh, who has escaped the castle's sacking and joins in her fight. While trying to reach the sewers, en route to the dungeons, they are forced to fight Moira, and Linh stays behind to stall her. The Princess frees her family, but they and Linh are quickly captured and brought before Julius. When she continues to resist him, Julius decides to cement his claim to the throne by marrying Violet instead. When the Princess fights back, she is thrown into the castle's nearby lake to drown, while Linh and Violet escape through a secret door.

The Princess escapes the fall with her life and sneaks back into the castle, where she reunites with Linh and Violet. The three equip themselves with weapons in a secret storeroom, and the Princess and Linh fight the mercenaries, while Violet frees Khai; however, Violet is soon discovered and captured. Linh is wounded while fighting Julius, but the Princess kills Moira and engages him in single combat. Weakened and on her knees, she bides her time while Julius gloats before preparing to kill her. At the right moment, she wrests Julius' sword away and decapitates him. Finally convinced of his daughter's strength and dedication, the King makes her the heir to the throne and decrees that women of the kingdom are allowed to choose their own way in life.

Cast
 Joey King as The Princess
 Allegra du Toit as the Young Princess
 Dominic Cooper as Julius
 Olga Kurylenko as Moira
 Veronica Ngo as Linh
 Ed Stoppard as The King
 Alex Reid as The Queen

Additionally, Katelyn Rose Downey appears as Violet, the Princess's sister, Kristofer Kamiyasu plays Khai, Linh's uncle, and Fergus O'Donnell appears as Kurr, one of Julius's soldier. Antoni Davidov and Todor Kirilov appears the Merc Leader and the Heavy Merc, respectively.

Production

On October 30, 2020, 20th Century Studios acquired the rights to Ben Lustig and Jake Thornton's spec script The Princess, with Hulu set to distribute. Neal H. Moritz’s Original Film co-produced the film with 20th Century and Derek Kolstad, Joey King (who was cast as the lead), Lustig, and Thornton served as producers. On November 12, 2021, Le-Van Kiet was announced as the film’s director.

Release
On November 12, 2021, The Princess was set to be released in the summer of 2022 on Hulu in the United States, on Disney+ internationally. On April 12, 2022, it was revealed that the film would be released on July 1, 2022. and on Star+ in Latin America on July 22, 2022.

Reception

Audience viewership 
According to Whip Media, The Princess was the 3rd most streamed movie across all platforms, in the United States, during the week of July 1, 2022 to July 3, 2022, and the 4th during the week of July 8, 2022, to July 10, 2022.

Critical response 
On the review aggregator website Rotten Tomatoes, the film holds an approval of 61% based on 85 critics, with an average rating of 5.5/10. The website's critics consensus reads, "Joey King is a credible action star and Princess, but she deserves a better kingdom than this uneven vehicle that gets weighed down by a clunky script and shabby production values." Metacritic, which uses a weighted average, assigned the film a score of 43 out of 100, based on 18 critics, indicating "mixed or average reviews".

Scott Mendelson of Forbes found The Princess to be a solid action movie and complimented its concept, drawing some comparisons with the Die Hard film franchise, while praising Joey King's performance and the action sequences. Jesse Hassenger of Consequence found the movie funny and praised its premise, applauded Le-Van Kiet's direction, stating the director provides a lot of action sequences across a frenetic direction, while saying the performances of the actors manage to be forceful. Andy Crump of Paste rated the movie 7.4 out of 10, praised the performances of the cast members, saying Joey King provides a fierce performance across the film, complimented the choreography though the action sequences, and said Le-Van Kiet, Ben Lustig, and Jake Thornton succeed to provide an action movie with a female lead challenging patriarchy across the direction and the script. Jennifer Green of Common Sense Media rated the film 3 out of 5 stars, praised the depiction of positive messages and role models, citing female-empowerment and courage, and complimented the diverse representations across the characters and their origins. Brian Tallerico of RogerEbert.com rated the movie 2 out of 4 stars, said the performance of Joey King manages to be the best element of the film, and found some of the action sequences entertaining, but stated the movie fails to provide a script that is sufficiently creative.

References

External links
 

2022 films
2022 action thriller films
2022 action comedy films
2020s English-language films
2020s historical thriller films
2020s historical action films
2020s historical comedy films
2020s comedy thriller films
20th Century Studios films
American historical thriller films
American historical action films
American historical comedy films
American comedy thriller films
Films set in the Middle Ages
Films about princesses
Films about royalty
Films set in castles
Films produced by Neal H. Moritz
Films scored by Natalie Holt
Hulu original films
Original Film films
Disney+ original films
2020s American films
American action thriller films
American action comedy films